Alberto Almici (born 11 January 1993) is an Italian footballer who plays as a right back for SPAL.

Club career

Early career
Born in Bergamo, Almici began his career on hometown's club Atalanta B.C., entering in the youth categories at 6 years old. He played on Primavera club, and in 2010–11 season his abilities impressed.

Gubbio (loan)
In July 2011, after a successful season with Primavera team, Almici was loaned to newly promoted club A.S. Gubbio 1910

He made his debut for the club on 14 August 2011, in Coppa Italia match against Benevento Calcio, and made his Serie B debut on 27 August, against Grosseto. He finished the season appearing in 23 matches (1492 minutes) with his team eventually being relegated.

Virtus Lanciano (loan) 
In July 2012, Almici was loaned to newly promoted S.S. Virtus Lanciano 1924, alongside Nadir Minotti.

Cesena (loan) 
In July 2013, Almici joined Serie B side Cesena on a loan deal.

Padova (loan) 
On 17 January 2014, Almici was again loaned to Serie B side Padova, after ending a loan spell with Cesena.

Later years
In September 2020, Almici signed for Serie C club Palermo as a free transfer. He left Palermo in January 2022 to join Serie B club SPAL in a permanent transfer.

International career
Almici was called up to friendlies against Montenegro U19.

Career statistics

Club

References

External links
 
 

1993 births
Footballers from Bergamo
Living people
Italian footballers
Italy youth international footballers
Atalanta B.C. players
A.S. Gubbio 1910 players
S.S. Virtus Lanciano 1924 players
A.C. Cesena players
Calcio Padova players
Latina Calcio 1932 players
U.S. Avellino 1912 players
Ascoli Calcio 1898 F.C. players
U.S. Cremonese players
Hellas Verona F.C. players
Pordenone Calcio players
Palermo F.C. players
S.P.A.L. players
Serie B players
Serie C players
Association football defenders